Iphiolaelaps is a genus of mites in the family Laelapidae.

Species
 Iphiolaelaps myriapoda Womersley, 1956

References

Laelapidae